The River Malvam (Anglicized: Malve), also known as the Malva or Malua is a river in ancient North Africa mentioned in the Historia Brittonum and Historia Regum Britanniae. In these accounts, it lies west of the Mountains of Azaria in Mauretania. Academics have identified it as the present-day Moulouya River.

Historia Brittonum 
The Historia Brittonum contains the earliest surviving version of the legendary origin story of the Scoti, later retold as the Irish legends of Fénius Farsaid, Scota, and Goídel Glas. In it, an unnamed Scythian nobleman living in Egypt travels with his household along the North African coast to Hispania, where they settle. The Historia Brittonum names a number of places along their route: Africa, Aras Philaenorum, Lacus Salinarum, between Rusicada and the Mountains of Azaria, through the River Malvam, through Mauretania to the Pillars of Hercules, then the Tyrrhenian Sea, before reaching Hispania.

Historia Regum Britanniae 
Geoffrey of Monmouth's Historia Regum Britanniae borrowed heavily from the Historia Brittonum. In it, Brutus of Troy follows the same route, this time starting from the island of Leogecia instead of Egypt. A few additions are made, such as defeating pirates between Rusicada and the Mountains of Azaria, pillaging Mauretania for supplies, and encountering sirens at the Pillars of Hercules. Instead of travelling through the River Malvam as in the Historia Brittonum, Geoffrey says that Brutus passed it before arriving at Mauretania.

Legacy 
The illusionary Martian canals were given names of mythical and real rivers, including one named the "Malva" after the River Malvam.

References

Geoffrey of Monmouth
Malvam